Marilu is a feminine given name which may refer to:

 Marilú (1927–2023), Mexican singer and actress
 Marilu Bueno (1940–2022), Brazilian actress
 Marilú Elízaga (1923–1995), stage name of Spanish actress María Luisa Pérez-Caballero Moltó
 Marilu Henner (born 1952), American actress, producer, radio host, and author
 Marilu Madrunio, Filipino forensic linguist 
 Marilú Marini (born 1945), Argentine actress
 Marilu Padua, Mexican human rights activist
 Marilù Parolini (1931–2012) Italian photographer and screenwriter
 Marilú Rojas Salazar, Mexican researcher and Catholic theologian
 Marilù Tolo (born 1944), Italian film actress

See also
 Mary Lou (name)
 Mary Louise (name)
 Marilou (singer)

Feminine given names